Claude Denson Pepper (September 8, 1900 – May 30, 1989) was an American politician of the Democratic Party, and a spokesman for left-liberalism and the elderly. He represented Florida in the United States Senate from 1936 to 1951, and the Miami area in the United States House of Representatives from 1963 until 1989.

Born in Chambers County, Alabama, Pepper established a legal practice in Perry, Florida, after graduating from Harvard Law School. After serving a single term in the Florida House of Representatives, Pepper won a 1936 special election to succeed Senator Duncan U. Fletcher. Pepper became one of the most prominent liberals in Congress, supporting legislation such as the Fair Labor Standards Act of 1938. After World War II, Pepper's conciliatory views towards the Soviet Union and opposition to President Harry Truman's 1948 re-nomination engendered opposition within the party. Pepper lost the 1950 Senate Democratic primary to Congressman George Smathers, and returned to private legal practice the following year.

In 1962, Pepper won election to a newly-created district in the United States House of Representatives. He emerged as a staunch anti-Communist, and strongly criticized Cuban leader Fidel Castro. Pepper served as chairman of the House Committee on Aging, and pursued reforms to Social Security and Medicare. From 1983 to 1989, he served as chairman of the powerful House Rules Committee. He died in office in 1989, and was honored with a state funeral. In 2000, the United States Postal Service issued a 33¢ Distinguished Americans series postage stamp honoring Pepper.

Early life
Claude Denson Pepper was born on September 8, 1900, in Chambers County, Alabama, the son of farmers Lena Corine Talbot (1877-1961) and Joseph Wheeler Pepper (1873-1945).  Pepper was the fourth child born to his parents; the first three died in infancy.  Pepper was an only child until he was ten years old; his younger siblings were Joseph, Sara and Frank.  He attended school in Dudleyville and Camp Hill, and graduated from Camp Hill High School in 1917.  He then operated a hat cleaning and repair business, taught school in Dothan and worked in an Ensley steel mill before beginning studies at the University of Alabama.

While in college he joined the Army for World War I and served in the Student Army Training Corps (SATC, precursor to the Reserve Officers' Training Corps).  The war ended before he saw active service, and after the SATC was disbanded, Pepper joined the ROTC. While lifting ammunition crates during a training event, Pepper suffered a double hernia, which required surgery to correct.  After graduating from the University of Alabama with his A.B. degree in 1921, Pepper was able to use his veterans' and disability benefits to attend Harvard Law School, and he received his LL.B. in 1924.

Career
Pepper taught law at the University of Arkansas (where his students included J. William Fulbright) and then moved to Perry, Florida, where he opened a law practice.  Pepper was a member of the Florida Democratic Party's executive committee from 1928 to 1929.

He was elected to the Florida House of Representatives in 1928 and served from 1929 to 1931. During his term, Pepper served as chairman of the House's Committee on Constitutional Amendments. In response to the Great Depression, Governor Doyle E. Carlton proposed austerity measures including layoffs of state employees and large tax cuts.  Pepper was among those who opposed Carlton's program, and popular support was with Carlton, so Pepper was among many legislators who lost when they ran for renomination in 1930.

After being defeated for reelection, Pepper moved his law practice to Tallahassee, the state capital.  In 1931, he met Mildred Webster outside the governor's office.  They began dating, and they married in St. Petersburg on December 29, 1936.  They remained married until her death in 1979, and had no children.

Florida government
Pepper served on the Florida Board of Public Welfare from 1931 to 1932, and was a member of the Florida Board of Bar Examiners in 1933.

U.S. Senate

In 1934, Pepper ran for the Democratic nomination for U.S. Senate, challenging incumbent Park Trammell. Pepper lost to Trammell in the primary runoff 51%–49%. But Pepper was unopposed in the 1936 special election following the death of Senator Duncan U. Fletcher, and succeeded William Luther Hill, who had been appointed pending the special election. In the Senate, Pepper became a leading New Dealer and close ally of President Franklin Delano Roosevelt. He was unusually articulate and intellectual, and, collaborating with labor unions, he was often the leader of the liberal-left forces in the Senate. His reelection in a heavily fought primary in 1938 solidified his reputation as the most prominent liberal in Congress. His campaign based on a wages-hours bill, which soon became the Fair Labor Standards Act of 1938. He sponsored the Lend-Lease Act. He joined other Southern senators to filibuster an anti-lynching bill in 1937, but broke with them to support anti-poll tax legislation in the 1940s.

In 1943, a confidential analysis by Isaiah Berlin of the Senate Foreign Relations Committee for the British Foreign Office described Pepper as:  A loud-voiced and fiery New Deal politician. Before Pearl Harbor, he was a most ardent interventionist. He is equally Russophile and apt to be critical of British Imperial policy. He is an out and out internationalist and champion of labour and negro rights (Florida has no poll tax) and thus a passionate supporter of the Administration's more internationalist policies. He is occasionally used by the President for the purpose of sending up trial balloons in matters of foreign policy. With all these qualities, he is, in his methods, a thoroughly opportunist politician.  Because of the power of the Conservative Coalition, he usually lost on domestic policy. He was, however, more successful in promoting an international foreign policy based on friendship with the Soviet Union. In 1946, Pepper appeared frequently in the national press and began to eye the 1948 presidential race. He considered running with his close friend and fellow liberal, former Vice President Henry A. Wallace, with whom he was active in the Southern Conference for Human Welfare.

"Eisenhower Boom"
Pepper was re-elected in 1944.

By 1947, momentum was growing for the Draft Eisenhower movement.  On September 10, 1947, US General Dwight D. Eisenhower disclaimed any association with the movement.  In mid-September 1947, US Representative W. Sterling Cole of New York voiced opposition to the nomination of Eisenhower or any other military leader, including George C. Marshall and Douglas MacArthur.  In December 1947, an actor impersonating Eisenhower sang "Kiss Me Again" during a political dinner in Washington, DC, whose attendees including President Truman (Democratic incumbent) and numerous Republican potential candidates:  the song's refrain ran "but it's too soon.  Some time next June, ask me, ask me again, ask me, ask me again."  On April 3, 1948, Americans for Democratic Action (ADA), led by members Adolf A. Berle Jr. and Franklin Delano Roosevelt Jr., declared its decision to support a ticket of Eisenhower and Supreme Court Justice William O. Douglas.  On April 5, 1948, Eisenhower stated his position remained unchanged:  he would not accept a nomination.  In mid-April 1948, American labor unions had entered the debate, as William B. Green, president of the American Federation of Labor, criticized the Congress of Industrial Organizations (CIO) for supporting the "Eisenhower Boom".

On July 2, 1948, the White House sent George E. Allen, friend and adviser to both Truman and Eisenhower, to the general to persuade him to make yet another denial about his candidacy.  On July 3, 1948, Democratic state organizations in Georgia and Virginia openly backed Eisenhower, as did former New York state court judge Jeremiah T. Mahoney.  The same day, Progressive presumptive candidate Wallace scorned the Eisenhower boom's southern supporters, saying, "They have reason to believe that Ike is reactionary because of his testimony on the draft and UMT [Universal Military Training]."  On July 4, 1948, rumors abounded, e.g., Eisenhower would accept an "honest draft" or (from the Los Angeles Times) Eisenhower would accept the nomination if made by Truman himself.  On July 5, 1948, a New York Times survey completed the previous day revealed that support for Eisenhower as Democratic nominee for president was "increasing among delegates", fueled by an "Anti-Truman Group" led by James Roosevelt of California, Jacob Arvey of Illinois, and William O'Dwyer of New York. US Senator John C. Stennis of Mississippi declared his support for Eisenhower. At 10:30 PM that night, Eisenhower issued an internal memo at Columbia for release by the university's PR director that "I will not, at this time, identify myself with any political party, and could not accept nomination for public office or participate in a partisan political contest." Support persisted nonetheless, and on July 6, 1948, a local Philadelphia group seized on Eisenhower's phrases about "political party" and "partisan political contest" and declared their continued support for him. The same day, Truman supporters expressed their satisfaction with the Eisenhower memo and confidence in the nomination.  By July 7, 1948, the week before the 1948 Democratic National Convention, the Draft Eisenhower movement drifted onwards, despite flat denials by Eisenhower and despite public declarations of confidence by Truman  and Democratic Party national chairman J. Howard McGrath.  Nevertheless, 5,000 admirers gathered in front of Eisenhower's Columbia residence to ask him to run.

In 1948, Pepper supported not his friend Henry A. Wallace but Eisenhower. In fact, on July 7, 1948, Pepper went further than any other supporter with an extraordinary proposal:   Senator Claude Pepper of Florida called on the Democratic party today to transform itself temporarily into a national movement, draft Gen. Dwight D. Eisenhower as a "national" and hence "nonpartisan" Presidential candidate and promise him substantial control of the party's national convention opening in Philadelphia next week.  It would be necessary, Mr. Pepper suggested, for the convention to invite General Eisenhower to write his own platform and to pick the Vice~Presidential nominee.  Moreover, the Senator said, the general should be assured that the Democrats would never make partisan claims on him, and he should be presented not as a "Democratic" candidate but the candidate of a convention "speaking not as Democrats but simply as Americans." Pepper managed to gain support from ADA.  The Draft Ike movement gained support from the CIO, the Liberal Party of New York State, Democratic local leaders (Jacob Arvey of Chicago, Frank Hague of New Jersey, Mayor William O'Dwyer of New York City, and Mayor Hubert Humphrey of Minneapolis), as well as ADA leaders Leon Henderson and James Roosevelt II.  Eisenhower made repeated statements that he would not accept the Democratic Party's nomination well into July, just ahead of the 1948 Democratic National Convention. When Eisenhower, who accepted to become president of Columbia University in January 1948) made three statements refusing the nomination during July 1948, Pepper and others gave up and provided lukewarm support to Harry S. Truman.  His third and last denial, sent by telegram to Pepper, ended the "Eisenhower Boom", and delegates began to reconsider Truman. (Pepper also made a bid for presidential candidacy but withdrew it.)  On the evening of July 9, 1948, Roosevelt conceded at "Eisenhower-for-President headquarters" that the general would not accept a nomination.  During the convention (July 12–14, 1948) and after, concern persisted that the Eisenhower Boom had weakened Truman's hopes in the November 1948 elections.

In 1950, Pepper lost his bid for a third full term in 1950 by a margin of over 60,000 votes. Ed Ball, a power in state politics who had broken with Pepper, financed his opponent, U.S. Representative George A. Smathers. A former supporter of Pepper, Smathers repeatedly attacked "Red Pepper" for having far-left sympathies, condemning both his support for universal health care and his alleged support for the Soviet Union. Pepper had traveled to the Soviet Union in 1945 and, after meeting Soviet leader Joseph Stalin, declared he was "a man Americans could trust." Because of his left-of-center sympathies with people like Wallace and actor-activist Paul Robeson and because of his bright red hair, he became widely nicknamed "Red Pepper".

At a speech made on November 11, 1946, before a pro-Soviet group known as Ambijan, which supported the creation of a Soviet Jewish republic in the far east of the USSR, Pepper told his listeners that "Probably nowhere in the world are minorities given more freedom, recognition and respect than in the Soviet Union [and] nowhere in the world is there so little friction, between minority and majority groups, or among minorities." Democracy was "growing" in that country, he added, and he asserted that the Soviets were making such contributions to democracy "that many who decry it might well imitate and emulate rather than despair."

Two years later, on November 21, 1948, speaking to the same group, he again lauded the Soviet Union, calling it a nation which has recognized the dignity of all people, a nation wherein discrimination against anybody on account of race is a crime, and which was in fundamental sympathy with the progress of mankind.

Communist allegations

Regarding the 1950 Florida Senate election, President Harry Truman called George Smathers into a meeting at the White House and reportedly said, "I want you to do me a favor. I want you to beat that son-of-a-bitch Claude Pepper." Pepper had been part of an unsuccessful 1948 campaign to "dump Truman" as the Democratic presidential nominee. Smathers ran against him in the Democratic primary (which at the time in Florida was tantamount to election, the Republican Party still being in infancy there). The contest was extremely heated, and revolved around policy issues, especially charges that Pepper represented the far left and was too supportive of Stalin. Pepper's opponents circulated widely a 49-page booklet titled The Red Record of Senator Claude Pepper. Pepper was defeated in the primary by Smathers.

Law practice

Pepper returned to law practice in Miami and Washington, failing in a comeback bid to regain a Senate seat in the 1958 Democratic primary in which he challenged his former colleague, Spessard Holland. However, Pepper did carry eleven counties, including populous Dade County where he later staged a remarkable comeback.

U.S. House 

In 1962, Pepper was elected to the United States House of Representatives from a newly created liberal district around Miami and Miami Beach established due to population growth in the area, becoming one of very few former United States Senators in modern times (the only other examples being James Wolcott Wadsworth Jr. from New York, Hugh Mitchell from Washington, Alton Lennon from North Carolina, Garrett Withers from Kentucky, and Magnus Johnson from Minnesota) to be elected to the House after their Senate careers. (Matthew M. Neely from West Virginia and Charles A. Towne from New York via Minnesota were also elected to the House after their Senate careers, but they had been elected to the House before their Senate careers as well.)

Pepper remained a member of the House until his death in 1989, rising to chair of the powerful Rules Committee in 1983. Despite a reputation as a leftist in his youth, Pepper turned staunchly anti-communist in the last third of his life, opposing Cuban leader Fidel Castro and supporting aid to the Nicaraguan Contras. Pepper voted in favor of the Civil Rights Acts of 1964 and 1968, and the Voting Rights Act of 1965. Pepper would be the only Representative from Florida who would vote in favor of the Civil Rights Act of 1964.

In the early 1970s, Pepper chaired the Joint House–Senate Committee on Crime; then, in 1977, he became chair of the new House Select Committee on Aging, which became his base as he emerged as the nation's foremost spokesman for the elderly, especially regarding Social Security programs. He succeeded in strengthening Medicare. In 1980 the committee under Pepper's leadership initiated what became a four-year investigation into health care scams that preyed on older people; the report, published in 1984 and commonly called "The Pepper Report", was entitled "Quackery, a $10 Billion Scandal".

In the 1980s, he worked with Alan Greenspan in a major reform of the Social Security system that maintained its solvency by slowly raising the retirement age, thus cutting benefits for workers retiring in their mid-60s, and in 1986 he obtained the passage of a federal law that abolished most mandatory retirement ages. In his later years, Pepper, who customarily began each day by eating a bowl of tomato soup with crackers, sported a replaced hip and hearing aids in both ears, but continued to remain an important and often lionized figure in the House.

In 1988, Pepper sponsored a legislation to create the National Center for Biotechnology Information (NCBI).  Enacted during his final term, the NCBI has revolutionized the exchange, sharing and analysis of genetic information and aided researchers worldwide to achieve advances in medical, computational and biological sciences.

Pepper became known as the "grand old man of Florida politics". He was featured on the cover of Time magazine in 1938 and 1983. During this time, Republicans often joked that he and House Speaker Tip O'Neill were the only Democrats who really drove President Ronald Reagan crazy.

Personal life and death
On May 26, 1989, Pepper was presented with the Presidential Medal of Freedom by President George H. W. Bush. Four days later, Pepper died in his sleep from stomach cancer.  His body lay in state for two days in the Rotunda of the U.S. Capitol; he was the 26th American so honored and was the last person to lie in state in the Capitol rotunda with an open casket.  Pepper was buried at Oakland Cemetery in Tallahassee. A special election was held in August 1989 to fill his seat, won by Republican Ileana Ros-Lehtinen, who served until retiring at the conclusion of the 115th Congress.

Legacy

A number of places in Florida are named for Pepper, including the Claude Pepper Center at Florida State University (housing a think tank devoted to intercultural dialogue in conjunction with the United Nations Alliance of Civilizations and an institute on aging) and the Claude Pepper Federal Building in Miami, as well as several public schools. Large sections of U.S. Route 27 in Florida are named Claude Pepper Memorial Highway. Since 2002, the Democratic Executive Committee (DEC) of Lake County has held an annual "Claude Pepper Dinner" to honor Pepper's tireless support for senior citizens.  The Claude Pepper Building (building number 31) at the National Institutes of Health in Bethesda, Maryland is also named for him.

Pepper's wife Mildred was well known and respected for her humanitarian work and was honored with a number of places in Florida named in her honor.  A year after his passing, Claude Pepper was honored in a play written by Shepard Nevel and directed by Phillip Church. Pepper premiered in June 1990 to a full house at the Colony Theater in Miami Beach. In 1993, Bradenton, Florida actor Kelly Reynolds portrayed Pepper in several performances held at area schools, libraries and nursing homes.

Awards
In 1982, Pepper received the Award for Greatest Public Service Benefiting the Disadvantaged, an annual presentation of the Jefferson Awards.

In 1983, he received the Golden Plate Award of the American Academy of Achievement.

In 1985, the Roosevelt Institute awarded Pepper its Four Freedoms medal.

Pepper would be posthumously inducted into the Florida Civil Rights Hall of Fame on February 29, 2012 in a ceremony held by Florida Governor Rick Scott in the Florida State Capitol. He was one of the first three along with Mary McLeod Bethune and Charles Kenzie Steele Sr to be inducted into it.

Bibliography

 Eyewitness to a Century with Hays Gorey (1987) – an autobiography

See also
 List of United States Congress members who died in office (1950–99)
 List of members of the American Legion
 List of members of the House Un-American Activities Committee
 Draft Eisenhower movement

Footnotes

Further reading

 Clark, James C., "Claude Pepper and the Seeds of His 1950 Defeat, 1944–1948", Florida Historical Quarterly, vol. 74, no. 1 (Summer 1995), pp. 1–22. in JSTOR
 Clark, James C. Red Pepper and Gorgeous George: Claude Pepper's Epic Defeat in the 1950 Democratic Primary (2011)
 Crispell, Brian Lewis, Testing the Limits: George Armistead Smathers and Cold War America (1999)
 Danese, Tracy E. Claude Pepper and Ed Ball: Politics, Purpose, and Power (2000)
 Denman, Joan E. "Senator Claude D. Pepper: Advocate of Aid to the Allies, 1939–1941", Florida Historical Quarterly, vol. 83, no. 2 (Fall 2004), pp. 121–148. in JSTOR
 Finley, Keith M. Delaying the Dream: Southern Senators and the Fight Against Civil Rights, 1938–1965 (Baton Rouge: LSU Press, 2008).
Swint, Kerwin C., Mudslingers: The Twenty-five Dirtiest Political Campaigns of All Time. Westport, CT: Praeger Publishers, 2006.

External links

 Biographical Directory of the US Congress
 Claude Pepper Papers at Florida State University
 Claude Pepper Library 
Claude Pepper Foundation
 Claude Pepper Center
 
 Oral History Interview with Claude Pepper from Oral Histories of the American South
 Claude D. Pepper, Late a Representative from Florida.  Washington, D.C. Government Printing Office 1990.

|-

|-

|-

|-

|-

|-

|-

|-

|-

|-

1900 births
1989 deaths
20th-century American lawyers
20th-century American politicians
American anti-communists
American legal scholars
Baptists from Alabama
Deaths from stomach cancer
Democratic Party United States senators from Florida
Florida lawyers
Harvard Law School alumni
Democratic Party members of the United States House of Representatives from Florida
Democratic Party members of the Florida House of Representatives
Military personnel from Alabama
Opposition to Fidel Castro
People from Perry, Florida
People from Tallapoosa County, Alabama
Presidential Medal of Freedom recipients
Recipients of the Four Freedoms Award